Rasbora tobana is a species of ray-finned fish in the genus Rasbora from Sumatra, Indonesia. It is restricted to Lake Toba and some of the rivers than run into the lake.

References

Rasboras
Freshwater fish of Sumatra
Taxa named by Ernst Ahl
Fish described in 1934